Jobinia is a genus of flowering plants of the family Apocynaceae first described in 1885. It is native to South America and Central America.

Species

formerly included
transferred to Cynanchum 
 Jobinia balslevii now  Cynanchum balslevii  
 Jobinia campii now  Cynanchum campii

References

Apocynaceae genera
Asclepiadoideae